The 1981 Anchorage mayoral election was held on October 4 and October 27, 1981, to elect the mayor of Anchorage, Alaska. It saw election of Tony Knowles.

Since no candidate had received 40% of the vote in the first round(which at least one candidate was required to obtain to avoid a runoff), a runoff was held between the top-two finishers.

Results

First round

Runoff

References

See also

Anchorage
Anchorage 
1981